Eidapere is a small borough in Kehtna Parish, Rapla County, Estonia.

It had a station on the Tallinn - Pärnu railway line operated by Elron, which closed in December 2018.

Politician and businessman Taavi Veskimägi (born 1974) was born in Eidapere.

References

External links
 Kehtna Parish 

Boroughs and small boroughs in Estonia